In Judaism, Hagalah is a method of making utensils suitable for use with kosher food by immersing utensils in boiling water.

Source in the Torah
This concept is derived from a verse in Parshat Matot that states:

Kasherable materials
Utensils made from any type of metal, stone, wood, bone, leather, or natural rubber may be kashered by hagalah. Earthenware, china, porcelain, glassware, and paper utensils cannot be kashered by hagalah. Any utensil which may get ruined during the hagalah process may not be kashered, out of concern that its owner would not want to properly kosher the utensil in order to avoid damaging it.

Process
Before immersion in the boiling water, the object must be cleaned thoroughly and left unused for a period of 24 hours. All surfaces of the item are then placed into a pot of water that is on the heat source and at a rolling boil.

See also

 Tevilat Keilim
 Chametz
 Milk and meat in Jewish law

References

Jewish ritual purity law
Hebrew words and phrases in Jewish law